Blitch is a surname. Notable people with the surname include:

 Iris Faircloth Blitch (1912–1993), American politician from the state of Georgia
 Newton Amos Blitch (1844–1921), state legislator and public official in Florida
 Peg Blitch (1934–2021), American politician from the state of Georgia

See also
 Blatch, surname
 Blitch, Georgia, unincorporated community in Bulloch County, Georgia